Major-General John Aldam Aizlewood  (4 January 1895 – 27 September 1990) was a senior officer of the British Army who served during World War I, the interwar years, and World War II.

Military career
John Aldan Aizlewood was commissioned into 4th Royal Irish Dragoon Guards on 12 August 1914.

He served in World War I on the Western Front and was awarded the Military Cross (with bar) while serving with the Machine Gun Corps. The citation for his MC, awarded in January 1918, reads:

The bar to his MC, awarded in June, reads:

After the war, he became a brigade major in India in 1927 and attended the Staff College, Quetta, from 1932 to 1933, alongside future generals John Grover and Edmund Hakewill-Smith. From 1936 to 1939 he was the Commanding Officer of the 4th/7th Royal Dragoon Guards.

He was promoted colonel 1 August 1939 with seniority 25 May 1939.

He also served in World War II initially becoming Commander of the 3rd (Meerut) Cavalry Brigade in 1939. In August 1941 as part of Paiforce (formerly Iraqforce), Brigadier Aizlewood commanded Hazelforce and the 2nd Indian Armoured Brigade Group during the Anglo-Soviet invasion of Persia. He moved on to be Commander of the 30th Armoured Brigade in August 1942 and then took responsibility for completing the conversion of the 42nd (East Lancashire) Infantry Division into a mechanised unit as the 42nd Armoured Division in December 1942.

Returning to the UK he was appointed Commander of Essex and Suffolk District in late 1943 and acting General Officer Commanding-in-Chief for Eastern Command in 1944 while Sir Alan Cunningham was away: he retired 9 May 1945 as an honorary major general.

In retirement he was Colonel of the 4th/7th Royal Dragoon Guards from 1948 to 1958.

References

Bibliography

External links
British Army Officers 1939−1945
Generals of World War II

1895 births
1990 deaths
British Army major generals
People educated at Uppingham School
Graduates of the Royal Military College, Sandhurst
British Army generals of World War II
British Army personnel of World War I
4th Royal Irish Dragoon Guards officers
Machine Gun Corps officers
4th/7th Royal Dragoon Guards officers
Deputy Lieutenants of Gloucestershire
Recipients of the Military Cross
Graduates of the Staff College, Quetta
Military personnel from Sheffield